"Kagome Kagome" (かごめかごめ, or ) is a Japanese children's game and the song (Warabe uta) associated with it. One player is chosen as the Oni (literally demon or ogre, but similar to the concept of "it" in tag) and sits blindfolded (or with their eyes covered). The other children join hands and walk in circles around the Oni while chanting the song for the game. When the song stops, the Oni tries to name the person standing directly behind them.

The song is a subject of much interest because of its cryptic lyrics which vary from region to region, and many theories exist about its meaning, but neither have been definitively explained.

Melody

Lyrics
In Japanese, the song has different lyrics depending on the region, but the most commonly known version is:

The most common interpretation is:
Kagome kagome / The bird in the basket/cage,
When, oh when will it come out
In the night of dawn
The crane and turtle slipped
Who is behind you now?

As the song is typically written in a single line without any punctuation, in addition to the odd phrasing and ambiguous words, it is also unclear which phrases are connected to which (For example, "In the night of dawn" could be an answer to "when oh when will it come out", or could be a setting for "the crane and turtle slipped").

Common variations in the song include replacing "夜明けの晩に" ("yoake no ban ni/in the evening of the dawn") with "夜明けの番人" ("yoake no bannin/the guard at/of dawn"), and "後ろの正面" ("ushiro no shoumen/in front of behind") with "後ろの少年" ("ushiro no shounen/the boy behind"). There are countless variations in history, many of which can be found recorded in writing.

Meaning
Many theories surround the meanings of the various phrases in the song. These include:

Kagome
"Kagome" (籠目): The holes in a basket
A corruption of "kakome" ("surround")
The shape of the holes in a traditional basket, a hexagon
The shape of the holes in a traditional, including the woven material, a hexagram
"Kagome" (籠女): A pregnant woman
Kagome - a caged bird
 Kagome - "Circle you"
Can also mean "lost"

Kago no naka no tori wa
As "kago" can mean both "cage" and "basket", a bird in a basket would, by the standards of the age, be a chicken
It is possible that "tori" is supposed to be a metaphor for torii, and that kago (typically woven out of bamboo) refers to a bamboo fence, and that thus the "torii surrounded by bamboo" is in fact a Shinto shrine.
In the case that kagome is interpreted as "pregnant woman", the bird in the cage is her unborn child, as the Japanese saying of "a bird in the cage" being a euphemism for pregnancy.

Itsu itsu deyaru
Can also be "itsu itsu deau" ("When oh when will we meet")
Can mean "When will it come out?"
Can mean "When can it come out?"

Yoake no ban ni
Can simply mean night
Can mean "from morning till night"
Can mean an inability to see light
Can mean a period of time that can be taken as either dawn or night (around 4 AM)
As "yoake" literally means the end of night, and "ban" can refer to both night or evening, this can be a purposeful contradiction referring to a time period that does not exist

Tsuru to kame ga subetta
The crane and turtle can be interpreted as symbols of good fortune, and thus their slipping can mean the coming of misfortune
The crane and turtle can be interpreted as symbols of long life, and thus their slipping can mean the coming of death
"Subetta" can be taken to be "統べった" or "統べた" ("to rule over"), in which case the crane and turtle symbolize a ruler
Could be a corruption of a line from a Kyoto nursery rhyme, "tsurutsuru tsuppaita"

Ushiro no shoumen daare
Can simply mean "who stands behind"
Can be taken to mean "who is it that stands right in front when you look behind" in a figurative manner, referring to hidden people in positions of power
Can be taken to be something said by someone who has been beheaded, whose head is looking at his own back
Can be taken to be something said by someone who is about to be beheaded, in which case the question "who is it who stands behind me" is in other words "who is my executioner"

Theories
The song is a subject of much academic interest and many theories surround its origin and meaning. Some such theories are:
The lyrics refer to the game only
In this theory the lyrics mean "Surround, surround (the Oni) / When will the Oni be able to switch roles with the next person? / Who is it standing behind you?".
The song is about a prostitute
In this theory the lyrics refer to a woman forced into prostitution (the bird in a cage) who has seen so many men that she cannot remember all of them ("who is it who stands behind" refers to the next person in line) and wonders when she will be able to escape (when oh when will it escape).
The song is about a pregnant woman
In this theory the "kagome" is a pregnant woman. Someone pushes her down a flight of stairs ("tsuru to kame ga subetta") and she miscarries, and wonders who killed her child ("ushiro no shoumen daare").
The song is about a convict to be executed
The "kagome" is a prison cell, and the bird is its prisoner. "Tsuru to kame ga subetta" symbolizes the end of life and fortune, and "ushiro no shoumen daare" is either the prisoner wondering who his executioner is, or his disembodied head gazing at his own body.

See also
Warabe uta
Tōryanse

References

External links
Description of game and song (Japanese)
Movie

Japanese games
Children's games